The Americas Zone was one of the three regional zones of the 1983 Davis Cup.

9 teams entered the Americas Zone in total. This year marked the abolition of the North & Central America and the South America sub-zones, with all teams now competing within a single bracket, with the overall winner being promoted to the following year's World Group.

Ecuador defeated Brazil in the final and qualified for the 1984 World Group.

Participating nations

Draw

First round

Peru vs. Brazil

Quarterfinals

Uruguay vs. Mexico

Colombia vs. Brazil

Ecuador vs. Caribbean/West Indies

Canada vs. Venezuela

Semifinals

Uruguay vs. Brazil

Ecuador vs. Canada

Final

Ecuador vs. Brazil

References

External links
Davis Cup official website

Davis Cup Americas Zone
Americas